The Omagh Hospital and Primary Care Complex is a local hospital in Omagh, County Tyrone, Northern Ireland. It is managed by the Western Health and Social Care Trust.

History
The hospital is situated in the grounds of the existing Tyrone and Fermanagh Hospital and replaced the old Tyrone County Hospital. It was designed by Todd Architects and built at a cost of £75 million. Its new facilities, which include a 24-hour Urgent Care and Treatment Centre, were opened to patients in June 2017.

References

External links 

 
 Inspection reports from the Regulation and Quality Improvement Authority

Western Health and Social Care Trust
Health and Social Care (Northern Ireland) hospitals
Buildings and structures in County Tyrone
Hospitals in County Tyrone